{{DISPLAYTITLE:C6H3N3O6}}
The molecular formula C6H3N3O6 (molar mass: 213.10 g/mol, exact mass: 213.0022 u) may refer to:

 1,2,3-Trinitrobenzene
 1,3,5-Trinitrobenzene